The 2013 3. deild karla (English: Men's Third Division) was the 32nd season of fourth-tier football in Iceland. Ten teams contested the league, which as of 2013 is no longer the lowest division in Iceland following the restructuring of the league pyramid. The fixtures for the 2013 campaign were released by the KSÍ on 10 November 2012; play began on 17 May and concluded on 14 September.

Previous season
The previous season the division was the lowest one in Iceland, but starting this season the 4. deild will be beneath the 3. deild. As a result, the 30 teams competing in the division last season were not just competing for two promotion places to 2. deild, but also for eight offered places in the 2013 season of the 3. deild. As a result, the remaining 20 teams were "relegated" to the new 4. deild for the 2013 season, although a couple of teams quit and a few new ones joined, as had always been the case with the 3. deild when it was the lowest division in Iceland.

Teams
The league was contested by ten clubs, eight of which played in the division during the 2012 season. There are two new clubs from the previous campaign, with eight remaining of the 30 teams that competed last year, with those not mentioned below either competing in the new 4. deild or not competing this season.
Fjarðabyggð and KFR were relegated from the 2012 2. deild karla, replacing Sindri and Ægir who were promoted to the 2013 2. deild karla
Huginn, ÍH, Kári, Leiknir F., Magni and Víðir reached the playoffs for a place in the 2. deild karla in the 2012 3. deild karla season, but were all beaten. They stayed on in the division on virtue of having reached the playoffs. To fill the two remaining places in the division the four teams in third place in the four groups last season competed in extra playoffs to see which teams stayed on in the division. Augnablik and Grundarfjörður won their opponents and won a place in the 2013 3. deild karla.

Club information

Statistics

League table

Results
Each team plays every opponent once home and away for a total of 18 matches per club, and 90 matches altogether.

Top goalscorers

References

3. deild karla seasons
Iceland
Iceland
4